Karl Magnus Wegelius (20 August 1884 – 9 December 1936) was a Finnish multi-sport athlete, who won five Olympic medals and eight Finnish national championships in sport shooting, gymnastics and track and field athletics.

Sport

Olympics

International 

He won two bronze medals at the ISSF World Shooting Championships in 1929:
 100 metre running deer single shots, men team
 100 metre running deer double shots, men team

National 

In shooting, he won six Finnish championships in single-shot moose in 1914, 1921, 1922, 1926, 1927 and 1928.

In track and field athletics, he won two Finnish national championship golds 4 × 100 metres relay and 1600 metre medley relay, both in 1910, representing the club Porin Tarmo.

He was a treasurer and a vice president of Finnish Shooting Sport Federation.

Career 

He performed his matriculation exam in Tampere Real Lycaeum in 1905 and graduated as a diplomi-insinööri from the Helsinki University of Technology in 1909.

Beginning in 1910, he worked as an engineer. He became the manager of the SOK production plants in 1918.

He was a board member of the Association of National Work.

He was a Knight (Chevalier) of the White Rose of Finland.

Family 

His parents were farmer Uno Wegelius and Helena Charlotta Wirzenius. He married Ester Tavaststjerna in 1915 and Elsbeth Anna Martinson in 1929. He had a daughter.

Death 

He died in the 1936 KLM Croydon accident while on a business trip to England.

References

1884 births
1936 deaths
Finnish male artistic gymnasts
Finnish male sport shooters
ISSF rifle shooters
Running target shooters
Gymnasts at the 1908 Summer Olympics
Shooters at the 1920 Summer Olympics
Shooters at the 1924 Summer Olympics
Olympic shooters of Finland
Olympic gymnasts of Finland
Olympic silver medalists for Finland
Olympic bronze medalists for Finland
Trap and double trap shooters
Olympic medalists in gymnastics
Olympic medalists in shooting
Medalists at the 1908 Summer Olympics
Medalists at the 1920 Summer Olympics
Medalists at the 1924 Summer Olympics
Victims of aviation accidents or incidents in 1936
Victims of aviation accidents or incidents in England
People from Hattula
20th-century Finnish people